Thomas Sylvester Howard (born December 11, 1964) is an American former professional baseball outfielder. He played 11 seasons in Major League Baseball (MLB) from 1990 to 2000 for the San Diego Padres, Cleveland Indians, Cincinnati Reds, Houston Astros, Los Angeles Dodgers, and St. Louis Cardinals. On April 11, 2000, he hit the first grand slam at Minute Maid Park.

He played three sports at Valley View High School in Germantown, Ohio. After high school, he played college baseball and college football as a backup quarterback for Ball State. He was named the inaugural Mid-American Conference Baseball Player of the Year in 1986 after leading the conference with a .448 batting average and 23 home runs. He would go on to be inducted into the Ball State athletics hall of fame in 1996. He became the first Ball State athlete ever selected in the first round of a major sports draft when the Padres took him with the 11th overall pick in the 1986 Major League Baseball Draft.

At the end of a May 2000 game Howard hit what Alex Kirshner at FiveThirtyEight has calculated to be the home run most insulting to the other team in major-league history where statistics, including pitch counts for each at-bat, are available. In the top of the ninth, playing for the visiting St. Louis Cardinals as they were leading the Pittsburgh Pirates 15-3, Howard came to the plate against Keith Osik, a Pirates catcher pitching in order to end the game quickly and give the team's bullpen some rest, a move commonly interpreted as conceding the game. With the count 3-0, Howard swung at Osik's next pitch, a violation of baseball's unwritten rules in that situation, and hit it into the stands. Kirshner found the combination of the run differential in the game's last inning, the Cardinals being the visiting team, and the home run coming off a position player on a 3-0 count to have made for the severest possible disrespect to the Pirates, yet unlike a similar home run hit by Yermin Mercedes in 2021 there appeared to have been not only no criticism of Howard, but no mention of it in news coverage of the game.

In 1015 Major League games over 11 seasons, Howard posted a .264 batting average (655-for-2483) with 297 runs, 123 doubles, 22 triples, 44 home runs, 264 RBI, 66 stolen bases, 165 bases on balls, .311 on-base percentage and .384 slugging percentage. He finished his career with a .986 fielding percentage playing at all three outfield positions. In nine postseason games, he hit .158 (3-for-19) with one RBI.

, Howard lived in Atlanta, had five children and worked in the health and fitness industry.

References

External links

1964 births
Living people
Major League Baseball outfielders
African-American baseball players
Ball State Cardinals baseball players
Ball State Cardinals football players
San Diego Padres players
Cleveland Indians players
Cincinnati Reds players
Houston Astros players
Los Angeles Dodgers players
St. Louis Cardinals players
Major League Baseball left fielders
Major League Baseball center fielders
Major League Baseball right fielders
Reno Padres players
Spokane Indians players
Wichita Pilots players
Las Vegas Stars (baseball) players
Chattanooga Lookouts players
Indianapolis Indians players
Memphis Redbirds players
Nashville Sounds players
Camden Riversharks players
Baseball players from Ohio
All-American college baseball players
People from Middletown, Ohio
21st-century African-American people
20th-century African-American sportspeople